Three ships of the Royal Fleet Auxiliary have borne the name RFA Olna:

  was an oiler launched in 1921 and beached at Crete in 1941 after being bombed.
  was an oiler launched in 1944 and scrapped in 1967.
  was a fast fleet tanker launched in 1965 and sold in 2001.

Royal Fleet Auxiliary ship names